The Isleta de San Juan (Spanish for Islet of San Juan) is a  island in the San Juan Bay in the Atlantic coast of northern Puerto Rico. Home of Old San Juan, it is the site of the oldest permanent European settlement in Puerto Rico (1521), and the second oldest European settlement in the West Indies after Santo Domingo (1496). Due its strategic location in the Caribbean during the Spanish colonization of the Americas it is home to a city wall and a number of militaristic buildings such as El Morro Castle. Today it is also home to many of Puerto Rico's government buildings such as the territory's capitol building (El Capitolio).

History 
Isleta de San Juan had been inhabited since before the Spanish arrival to the Caribbean in 1492. Remains of a shell shed, and a fishing site were uncovered in 1937 (near the modern-day Puerto Rico National Guard Museum) in by archaeologist Irving Rouse from the University of Yale. 

The island was first mapped in 1519 with the intention of surveying possible sites for a future home for the settlers of Caparra. Road connection with the main island of Puerto Rico was not completed until 1519. The town of Puerto Rico de San Juan Bautista was officially founded on July 20, 1521. Construction of La Fortaleza, the Casa de la Contratación and Juan Ponce de León's residence of Casa Blanca began the same year. With the establishment of a port and other militaristic infrastructure, the original colonial settlement of San Juan kept growing in size until the 18th century when the town of El Roble (today Río Piedras) took its place as the largest urban center in the region.

Geography 
Isleta de San Juan is a small island measuring 3-square-mile (7.8 km2). It is separated from the main island of Puerto Rico by El Boquerón and the San Antonio Channel (Caño de San Antonio). The island is hilly and rocky. With the exception of its western end and its south coast, the island is partially surrounded by cliffs, and promontories such as El Morro in its northwestern end.

Human geography 
The population center of Isleta de San Juan can be divided into west and east. Its western part includes the neighborhoods (subbarrios) of Ballajá, Catedral, Mercado, San Cristóbal, San Francisco and Marina that constitute Old San Juan, and its eastern part constitutes the neighborhood of Puerta de Tierra, location of many of Puerto Rico's government buildings such as its capitol building.

Culture 
The historic Normandie Hotel is located in the Isleta de San Juan.

Demographics 
Its population in 2010 was about 7,000.

Transportation 
Isleta de San Juan is connected to the main island of Puerto Rico by three bridges and a causeway. Dos Hermanos Bridge connects it to El Condado, while the San Antonio Bridges connect it with Isla Grande. Although no longer in use, the San Antonio Railroad Bridge is still preserved today. It used to provide railway connection between Old San Juan's Covadonga Terminal and the rest of Puerto Rico.

Traffic into the island is normally closed during the San Sebastián Street Festival.

Gallery

References

Geography of San Juan, Puerto Rico
Islands of Puerto Rico